Murder DIEary is an upcoming South Korean streaming television series directed by Lee Chang-hee, starring Choi Woo-shik, Son Suk-ku, and Lee Hee-joon The series based on the naver webtoon of the same name, tells the story of a man who accidentally murders a serial killer and a detective who pursues him relentlessly.

Cast

Main 
 Choi Woo-shik as Lee Tang
 An ordinary college student who realizes that he has the ability to identify evil people after his first accidental murder.
 Son Suk-ku as Jang Nan-gam
 A detective who pursues a murder case committed by Lee Tang.
 Lee Hee-joon as Song Chon
 A former detective who hunts down Lee Tang.

References

External links 
 

Upcoming Netflix original programming
Korean-language Netflix original programming
Television shows based on South Korean webtoons
South Korean web series